Primary pulmonary histoplasmosis is caused by inhalation of Histoplasma capsulatum spores, and approximately 10% of people with this acute infection develop erythema nodosum.

See also 
 Histoplasmosis

References 

Mycosis-related cutaneous conditions